Leon Clarke (January 10, 1933 – October 5, 2009) was an American football tight end who played in the National Football League (NFL) between 1956 and 1963.

Clarke prepped at Venice High School. He played college football at the University of Southern California and played in the Pro Bowl in 1956.

Clarke died of pancreatitis in Los Alamitos, California on October 5, 2009.  He was 76 years old.

References

External links
NFL.com player page

1933 births
2009 deaths
Deaths from pancreatitis
People from Greater Los Angeles
American football tight ends
USC Trojans football players
Los Angeles Rams players
Cleveland Browns players
Minnesota Vikings players
Western Conference Pro Bowl players
Venice High School (Los Angeles) alumni
Players of American football from Los Angeles